The 2022–23 season is the 123rd in the history of Borussia Mönchengladbach and the club's 15th consecutive season in the top flight. They are participating in the Bundesliga and DFB-Pokal.

Players

On loan

Transfers

In

Out

Pre-season and friendlies

Competitions

Overall record

Bundesliga

League table

Results summary

Results by round

Matches 
The league fixtures were announced on 17 June 2022.

DFB-Pokal

Statistics

Appearances and goals

|-
! colspan=12 style=background:#dcdcdc; text-align:center| Goalkeepers

|-
! colspan=12 style=background:#dcdcdc; text-align:center| Defenders 
 

 
 
 
|-
! colspan=12 style=background:#dcdcdc; text-align:center| Midfielders
 

 
 

|-
! colspan=12 style=background:#dcdcdc; text-align:center| Forwards

 
 

 

|-
! colspan=12 style=background:#dcdcdc; text-align:center| Players transferred out during the season  

 

|-

Goalscorers

References

Borussia Mönchengladbach seasons
Borussia Mönchengladbach
Borussia Mönchengladbach